The list that follows is the Liberal Democrats Frontbench Team/Shadow Cabinet led by Charles Kennedy, who was Party leader from 1999 to 2006. The Party began to refer to its Frontbench Team as a Shadow Cabinet during Kennedy's tenure as leader.

2005–2006

Shadow Cabinet
Leader of the Liberal Democrats - Charles Kennedy
Deputy Leader of the Liberal Democrats and Shadow Foreign Secretary - Menzies Campbell
Shadow Chancellor - Vince Cable
Shadow Home Secretary - Mark Oaten
Shadow Defence Secretary - Michael Moore
Shadow Trade Secretary - Norman Lamb
Shadow Work and Pensions Secretary - David Laws
Shadow Education Secretary - Ed Davey
Shadow Communities and Local Government Secretary - Sarah Teather
Shadow Office of the Deputy Prime Minister and Liberal Democrat Party President - Simon Hughes
Shadow Health Secretary - Prof. Steve Webb
Leader in the House of Lords - The Lord McNally
Shadow Environment and Rural Affairs Secretary - Norman Baker
Shadow International Development Secretary - Andrew George
Shadow Scotland Secretary - John Thurso
Shadow Transport Secretary- Tom Brake
Shadow Culture Secretary - Don Foster
Shadow Northern Ireland and Welsh Secretary - Lembit Öpik
Shadow Shadow Leader of the House - David Heath
Liberal Democrat Chief Whip - Andrew Stunell
Liberal Democrat Chief Whip in the Lords - The Lord Shutt of Greetland
Chair of the Parliamentary Party - Matthew Taylor
Shadow Minister for Women and Spokesperson for Older People - Sandra Gidley

2003–2005

Shadow Cabinet
Leader of the Liberal Democrats - Charles Kennedy
Deputy Leader of the Liberal Democrats and Shadow Foreign Secretary - Menzies Campbell
Shadow Chancellor - Vince Cable
Shadow Chief Secretary to the Treasury - David Laws
Shadow Home Secretary - Mark Oaten
Shadow Defence Secretary - Paul Keetch
Shadow Trade Secretary - Malcolm Bruce
Shadow Work and Pensions Secretary - Prof. Steve Webb
Shadow Education Secretary - Phil Willis
Shadow Office of the Deputy Prime Minister - Ed Davey
Shadow Health Secretary - Paul Burstow
Leader in the House of Lords - 2004-2005 - The Lord McNally
Shadow Environment and Rural Affairs Secretary - Norman Baker
Shadow International Development Secretary - Tom Brake
Shadow Scotland Secretary and Shadow Transport Secretary- John Thurso
Shadow Culture Secretary - Don Foster
Shadow Northern Ireland and WelshSecretary - Lembit Öpik
Shadow Shadow Leader of the House - Paul Tyler
Liberal Democrat Chief Whip - Andrew Stunell
Liberal Democrat Chief Whip in the Lords - The Lord Roper
Chair of the Parliamentary Party - Matthew Taylor
Shadow Minister for Women and Spokesperson for Older People - Sandra Gidley
Shadow Minister for Rural Affairs and Food - Andrew George
Shadow Minister for Foreign Affairs - Michael Moore
London Mayoral Candidate and Spokesperson for London - Simon Hughes

2001–2003

Shadow Cabinet
Leader of the Liberal Democrats - Charles Kennedy
Deputy Leader of the Liberal Democrats - 2001-2002 Alan Beith - 2002-2003 Menzies Campbell
Shadow Foreign Secretary - Menzies Campbell
Shadow Chancellor - Matthew Taylor
Shadow Chief Secretary to the Treasury - 2001-2002 Ed Davey - 2002-2003 David Laws
Shadow Home Secretary - Simon Hughes
Shadow Defence Secretary - 2002-2003 Paul Keetch
Shadow Trade Secretary - Vince Cable
Shadow Work and Pensions Secretary - Prof. Steve Webb
Shadow Education Secretary - Phil Willis
Shadow Office of the Deputy Prime Minister - 2002-2003 Ed Davey
Shadow Shadow Secretary of State DTLR - Don Foster
Shadow Health Secretary - Evan Harris
Leader in the House of Lords - 2004-2005 - The Lord McNally
Shadow Environment and Rural Affairs Secretary - 2001-2002 Malcolm Bruce - 2002-2003 Norman Baker
Shadow Scotland Secretary - John Viscount Thurso
Shadow Transport Secretary- 2002-2003 Don Foster
Shadow Culture Secretary - Nick Harvey
Shadow Northern Ireland and Welsh Secretary - Lembit Öpik
Shadow Shadow Leader of the House - Paul Tyler
Liberal Democrat Chief Whip - Andrew Stunell
Chair of the Parliamentary Party - Mark Oaten
Chair of the Campaigns and Communications Committee - The Lord Razzall
Shadow Minister for Rural Affairs and Food - Andrew George

1999–2001

Shadow Cabinet
Leader of the Liberal Democrats - Charles Kennedy
Deputy Leader of the Liberal Democrats - Alan Beith
Liberal Democrat Shadow Foreign Secretary - Menzies Campbell
Shadow Chancellor - Matthew Taylor
Shadow Trade Secretary - Vince Cable
Shadow Work and Pensions Secretary - Prof. Steve Webb
Shadow Secretary of State DETR - Don Foster
Shadow Health Secretary - Nick Harvey
Shadow Northern Ireland and Welsh Secretary - Lembit Öpik
Liberal Democrat Chief Whip and Shadow Leader of the House of Commons - Paul Tyler
Chair of the Parliamentary Party - Malcolm Bruce
Shadow Minister for Agriculture and Rural Affairs - Colin Breed
Shadow Fisheries Minister -Andrew George 
Shadow Disabilities Minister - 2000-2001 Andrew George
Liberal Democrat Spokesperson for London - Ed Davey

References

Kennedy
Politics of the United Kingdom
1990s in the United Kingdom
1999 establishments in the United Kingdom
2006 disestablishments in the United Kingdom
British shadow cabinets
1999 in British politics